Post Mortem is a 1982 Indian Malayalam-language thriller film directed by J. Sasikumar based on a screenplay by Dr. Pavithran. The film was produced by Pushparajan under the banner of Rajapushpa Productions. The film stars Prem Nazir in the lead role along with Mammootty, Sukumaran and Balan K. Nair in other supporting roles. The film's score was composed by KJ Joy. The film was a commercial success and was remade in four languages - in Tamil in 1983 as Vellai Roja , in Telugu in 1984 as S. P. Bhayankar, in Kannada in 1988 as Dharmathma and in Hindi in 1993 as Tahqiqaat.

Cast
Prem Nazir as Fa.James /Dysp
Mammootty as Johnny
Sukumaran as Peter Esthappan
Swapna as Aleese Esthappan
T. G. Ravi as Chakkochen
Balan K. Nair as Mammukka 
Prathapachandran as Esthappan
Meena as Reethamma
Jalaja as Aswathy Teacher
Janardanan as Unni
Kuthiravattam Pappu as const. Kurup
Sathyakala

Soundtrack
The music was composed by K. J. Joy with lyrics by Poovachal Khader.

References

External links
 

1982 films
1980s Malayalam-language films
Indian thriller films
Malayalam films remade in other languages
1982 thriller films
Films directed by J. Sasikumar